M. Estella Sprague (1870 – 1940) was an American home economics professor and academic administrator at the University of Connecticut, then later at Connecticut Agricultural College. She served as the first dean of the Division of Home Economics and dean of women from 1920 to 1926. Sprague had been a professor of home economics since 1917. She had been pivotal to the creation of the home economics deanship, having lobbied President Charles L. Beach in 1922 to appoint a home economics dean and hire more senior faculty for the division's three departments. Her letter observed that other land-grant institutions had recruited more faculty of more senior rank than UConn had done.

The first woman extension service worker in Connecticut, Sprague served during World War I as the state director of home economics for the Federal Food Administration. Appointed to this office in June 1917, she coordinated the state's women's organizations and worked to maximize food production and conservation during the war effort. The college trustees reported that "a woman of broad vision and forceful personality who knew Connecticut people" was needed for this office, and that Sprague "more than met these requirements." Prior to this appointment, Sprague had served as assistant state leader of the Boys & Girls Clubs of America. Membership greatly increased during her term as the United States prepared for war.

Built in 1942, the M. Estella Sprague Residence Hall, a three-story women's dormitory on UConn's main campus in Storrs, is named in her honor.

In addition to her academic legacy, Sprague bequeathed to the University of Connecticut a substantial collection of costumes and textiles: more than 7,000 items, ranging from ancient Egyptian fabrics to contemporary designer dresses. Most pieces dated from the 19th and early 20th centuries. An exhibit, "Perfect in Her Place: Women at Work in Industrial America," at the Homer Babbidge Library showcasing Sprague's collection ran from March through April 1985.

References 

1870 births
1940 deaths
Home economists
University of Connecticut faculty
American women academics